The Garibaldi, known historically also as the Catalina goldfish and marine goldfish and now commonly as the Garibaldi damselfish (Hypsypops rubicundus) is a species of bright orange fish in the damselfish family. It occurs in the subtropical northeastern part of the Pacific Ocean. The English name, Garibaldi, is based on an Italian surname and is a reference to the Italian general and political figure Giuseppe Garibaldi, whose followers often wore a characteristic scarlet or red shirt. As is the case in all damselfish, male Garibaldis aggressively defend the nest site after the female lays eggs.

Description
Adult fish in this species are orange in color. Juveniles are more reddish, and have many small iridescent blue spots, which they lose as they become adult. Adult Garibaldis also have a more opaque tail and dorsal fin. The Garibaldi is the official marine state fish of California and is protected in Californian coastal waters.

Distribution and habitat
Garibaldis are found in water from a depth of up to  depth, usually in association with rock reefs, and typically over rocky sea-bottoms. This species is native to the north-eastern subtropical parts of the Pacific Ocean, ranging from Monterey Bay, California, to Guadalupe Island, Baja California.

Behavior
Garibaldis feed mainly on invertebrates, which they remove from the rocks. Like most damselfish, adult Garibaldis maintain a home territory.  The male clears a sheltered nest site within his territory; the female then deposits eggs within the nest. The male guards the nest area until the eggs hatch, which takes 19–21 days. During the time period that the eggs are developing, the male Garibaldi aggressively tries to keep all other fish away from the (very edible) eggs, and will boldly attack much larger swimming creatures, including humans, to the point of biting divers in order to try to drive them away from the area where the eggs are deposited.

In aquarium
It is peaceful during the juvenile period. But as long as the body is slightly larger, it will show territorial rights to other meek fish and compete with other small fish for territory.

References

External links
 
 

Pomacentridae
Fauna of California
Fauna of the Baja California Peninsula
Symbols of California
Fish described in 1854
Taxa named by Charles Frédéric Girard
Giuseppe Garibaldi